Miss USA 1953 was the 2nd Miss USA pageant, held at the Long Beach Municipal Auditorium in Long Beach, California on July 16, 1953. 

At the end of the event, Jackie Loughery of New York crowned Myrna Hansen of Illinois as Miss USA 1953. It is the first victory of Illinois in the pageant's history. 

Contestants from 43 states and cities competed in this year's pageant. The competition was hosted by Bob Russel.

Results

Placements

Special awards

Pageant

Selection committee 
Jeff Chandler – American actor
Rhonda Fleming – American actress and singer
Arlene Dahl – American actress
Constance Moore – American actress and singer
Buddy Westmore – American moviemaker
Varga – Artist

Contestants
43 contestants competed for the title.

Notes

References

External links
Miss USA official website

1953
1953 in the United States
1953 beauty pageants
Beauty pageants in the United States
1953 in California
1953